Pultenaea mollis, commonly known as soft bush-pea or guinea flower bush pea, is a species of flowering plant in the family Fabaceae and is endemic to south-eastern Australia. It is an erect or spreading shrub with narrow linear to elliptic or needle-shaped leaves and clusters of up to ten yellow to orange flowers with red markings.

Description
The standard petal and wings are yellow with red markings and the keel is red.

TaxonomyPultenaea mollis was first formally described in 1838 by John Lindley in Thomas Mitchell's journal, Three Expeditions into the interior of Eastern Australia. The specific epithet (mollis) means "soft".

Distribution and habitat
Soft bush-pea grows in forest, sometimes in heathland, and occurs in coastal areas south from Gosford in New South Wales to the southern half of Victoria where it is widespread and locally common. The species also occurs in the north-east of Tasmania.

Conservation statusPultenaea mollis is classified as "vulnerable" under the Tasmanian Government Threatened Species Protection Act 1995''.

References

mollis
Fabales of Australia
Flora of New South Wales
Flora of Victoria (Australia)
Flora of Tasmania
Taxa named by John Lindley
Plants described in 1838